Alexa Alemanni is an American actress. She appeared as Allison, secretary to Don Draper on the AMC original series Mad Men (2007–2010).

Life and career
Alemanni is a graduate of Vassar College with a bachelor's degree in theatre performance. On stage, she has appeared in the William Shakespeare comedies The Merchant of Venice (Portia) and Twelfth Night (Viola). She played Helen of Troy in an international touring production of The Oresteia that performed both in Athens, Greece, and Milan. She also performed as part of the ensemble with the Comedy Central Theater.

In 2005, Alemanni made her first TV appearance on The West Wing in the episode "365 Days" as an intern for White House Chief of Staff Leo McGarry. Her other notable TV credit was appearing as Amy Deckerman, a murder victim in "Doubt", the third-season premiere episode of Criminal Minds.

She appeared in two small films that were shown at film festivals in 2008, La Milonga and Sanctuary, neither of which received a theatrical release.

Her first appearance on Mad Men was in the third episode of the first season, "The Marriage of Figaro". Alemanni appeared in three other episodes in the first season, but appeared only once in the second season. With her character having been installed as Don Draper's secretary, she appeared in 11 of the 13 episodes of season 3.

Alemanni was included among the cast of Mad Men as a winner at the 16th Screen Actors Guild Awards for Outstanding Performance by an Ensemble in a Drama Series. She was presented with an award along with other members of the cast.

Filmography

Film

Television

References

External links

American television actresses
Living people
Place of birth missing (living people)
Year of birth missing (living people)
Vassar College alumni
21st-century American actresses